Mary Testa (born June 4, 1955) is an American stage and film actress. She is a three-time Tony Award nominee, for performances in revivals of Leonard Bernstein's On the Town (1998), 42nd Street (2001) and Oklahoma (2019).

Early life
Testa was born in Philadelphia and has one sister. At age four, her family moved to Rhode Island. She studied acting at the University of Rhode Island. Testa left school to move to New York in 1976 to pursue a performing career.

Stage
Testa made her debut Off-Broadway at Playwrights Horizons as Miss Goldberg in William Finn's one-act musical In Trousers (1979), part one of his "Marvin Trilogy." She next performed in Finn's March of the Falsettos, and later in Company, at Playwrights.

Her Broadway roles include Joyce Heth in Barnum (1982), movie columnist Hedda Hopper in Marilyn: An American Fable (1983), Angel in The Rink (1984), Domina in A Funny Thing Happened on the Way to the Forum (1996–1997), Madame Dilly in On the Town (1998), Magdalena in Marie Christine, Maggie Jones in 42nd Street (2001–2002), the Matron in Chicago (2005), Melpomene in Xanadu (2007–2008), General Matilda B. Cartwright in Guys and Dolls (2009), Madame Morrible in Wicked (2014), and Aunt Eller in Oklahoma! (2019).

She is a frequent collaborator with such acclaimed musical dramatists as William Finn (Infinite Joy, A New Brain, In Trousers) and Michael John LaChiusa (Marie Christine, See What I Wanna See, First Lady Suite), while also having appeared in the works of Stephen Sondheim, Kander & Ebb, Flaherty & Ahrens, and Leonard Bernstein, among other Off-Broadway and regional theatre credits. She also frequently performs in concerts and cabaret shows.

On December 28, 2020, it was announced that Testa would star as Skinner in a benefit concert presentation of Ratatouille the Musical, an internet meme that originated on TikTok, inspired by the 2007 Disney/Pixar film. The concert streamed exclusively on TodayTix on January 1, 2021.

Film, television and recording
Testa made her film debut in Going in Style (1979), and has appeared in numerous movie and television roles since, including Sophia in the 2003 sitcom Whoopi, Zia Maria Luisa in the 2014 film Big Stone Gap, and Sister Clare in the 2004 film adaptation of Tony n' Tina's Wedding. She also appeared in such films as The Business of Strangers (2001), Stay (2005), Eat Pray Love (2010), The Bounty Hunter (2010) and the TV series Law & Order, Whoopi's Littleburg, 2 Broke Girls, Smash, White Collar, Cosby, Sex and the City, and Life on Mars.

From 1999 to 2002 she appeared frequently as the voice of Shirley the Medium on Courage the Cowardly Dog.

In addition to her show albums, Testa and Michael Starobin released an album, Have Faith, in 2014.  It contains contemporary interpretations of songs by artists such as Alanis Morissette, Prince, The Beach Boys, Leonard Cohen, Finn and LaChiusa.

Selected stage credits
Miss Goldberg in In Trousers (1979)
Angel Antonelli in The Rink (1984)
Rita La Porta in Lucky Stiff (1988 & 2003)
Domina in A Funny Thing Happened on the Way to the Forum (1996)
Lisa in A New Brain (1998)
Madame Maude P. Dilly in On the Town (1998)
Magdalena in Marie Christine (1999)
Fanny Brice in Ziegfeld Follies of 1936 (Encores! Production) (1999)
Dorine in Tartuffe (2000)
Maggie Jones in 42nd Street (2001)
Various roles in String of Pearls (2003)
Lorena Hickock in First Lady Suite (2004)
Matron "Mamma" Morton in Chicago (2005)
The Medium/Aunt Monica in See What I Wanna See (2006)
Melpomene in Xanadu (2007)
General Cartwright in Guys and Dolls (2009)
Love, Loss, and What I Wore (2010)
Anna Edson Taylor in Queen of the Mist (2011)
Madame Morrible in Wicked (2014)
Aunt Eller in Oklahoma! (2018–2019)
Chef Skinner in Ratatouille: The Musical (2020-2021)

Selected concert appearances
Broadway Unplugged 2004 ("Hard-Hearted Hannah: The Vamp of Savannah")
Broadway Unplugged 2005 ("The Thrill is Gone")
The Broadway Musicals of 1930 ("I Happen to Like New York" and "My First Love—My Last Love")
The Broadway Musicals of 1933 ("I'll Be Hard to Handle" and "Harlem on My Mind")

Awards and nominations

References

External links

1955 births
American stage actresses
American musical theatre actresses
Living people
American film actresses
American television actresses
20th-century American actresses
21st-century American actresses
Actresses from Philadelphia
Actresses from Rhode Island
University of Rhode Island alumni